The principal balance, in regard to a mortgage or other instrument of debt, is the amount due and owed to satisfy the payoff of an underlying obligation, sans interest or other charges.

Amortized mortgage loans automatically pay a portion of each monthly payment to the principal balance, with the rest being paid as interest.

An interest-only loan doesn't require any money to be paid toward the principal balance each month, but such payment is allowable.

See also 
Unpaid principal balance

References

Mortgage